A sector collapse is the collapse of a portion of a volcano due to a phreatic eruption, an earthquake, or the intervention of new magma. Occurring on many volcanoes, sector collapses are generally one of the most hazardous volcanic events, and will often create lateral blasts and landslides.

Examples 
A sector collapse was documented during the 1980 eruption of Mount St. Helens. It occurred due to an earthquake that was a result of the eruption.

In Italy, the Sciara del Fuoco is a scar left by a sector collapse that happened over 5000 years ago. The volcano involved was the Stromboli volcano.

A sector collapse occurred during an eruption of a volcano in Nicaragua.

See also 
Volcanology

Debris flow

References 

Volcanoes
Geology terminology